Nicothoe is a genus of copepods, containing the following species:
Nicothoe analata Kabata, 1966
Nicothoe astaci Audouin & Edwards, 1826
Nicothoe brucei Kabata, 1967
Nicothoe simplex Kabata, 1967
Nicothoe tumulosa Cressey, 1976

References 

Siphonostomatoida
Taxa named by Henri Milne-Edwards
Taxa named by Jean Victoire Audouin